Alan Roderick Haig-Brown (born 1941) is a Canadian novelist and non-fiction writer. He specializes in commercial marine and commercial fishing writing and photography. He is a regular contributor to a number of marine publications including Professional Mariner magazine where many of his articles are archived.

He lives in New Westminster, British Columbia and Bangkok, Thailand.

He is the son of writer Roderick Haig-Brown and the father of film maker Helen Haig-Brown.

Bibliography
The Suzie A - 1991
Fishing for a Living - 1993
Hell No, We Won't Go: Vietnam Draft Resisters in Canada - 1996
The Fraser River - 1996 
Still Fishin - 2010  
The Teak Box -2012

References

External links
Author's website
Authors website
ABC Bookworld
Professional Mariner Magazine

1941 births
Living people
Canadian male novelists